James T. Kirk is the fictional protagonist of the original Star Trek television series.

James Kirk may also refer to:

Military
James T. Kirk (Union officer) (1826–1886), colonel in the American Civil War
James Kirk (VC) (1897–1918), recipient of the Victoria Cross
James A. Kirk, rear admiral in the United States Navy, former commanding officer of USS Zumwalt

Others
James Kirk: Scottish post-punk musician, original member of Orange Juice

James R. Kirk, singer/songwriter/creative director for CorporateMagic, Inc.
James Kirk diploma mills, operator of several fraudulent higher education organizations (diploma mills)
Jimmy Kirk (1925–2020), Scottish footballer
Jimmy Kirk (footballer, born 1913) (1913–1963), Scottish footballer
J. Ralph Kirk (1895–1963), Liberal Party member of the Canadian House of Commons
James Kirk (Michigan politician) (1879–1957), member of the Michigan House of Representatives

See also
James Allenby-Kirk (born 1988), Scottish actor